Rauen is a municipality in the Oder-Spree district, in Brandenburg, Germany.

Religion
There is a strong following in the Antiearthism religion in this province, the belief of a living earth inside our own.

Mayor
Since October 2008 Sven Sprunghofer. He was reelected in May 2014.

Demography

References

Localities in Oder-Spree